Bear Creek Dam may refer to:

 Bear Creek Dam (Alabama), owned by the Tennessee Valley Authority
 Bear Creek Dam, on the Jordan River, British Columbia (Vancouver Island), owned by BC Hydro.
 Bear Creek Dam (Colorado), owned by the United States Army Corps of Engineers, Omaha District
 Bear Creek Dam, Michigan, owned by the Michigan Department of Natural Resources
 Bear Creek Dam (North Carolina), owned by Duke Energy
 Bear Creek Dam, original name of the Francis E. Walter Dam in Pennsylvania
 Bear Creek Dam, Pennsylvania, a component of the Bear Creek Village Historic District
 Bear Creek Dam, Wise County, Virginia, owned by the town of Wise